Evofosfamide (INN, USAN; formerly known as TH-302) is an investigational hypoxia-activated prodrug that is in clinical development for cancer treatment. The prodrug is activated only at very low levels of oxygen (hypoxia). Such levels are common in human solid tumors, a phenomenon known as tumor hypoxia.

Evofosfamide is being evaluated in clinical trials for the treatment of multiple tumor types as a monotherapy and in combination with chemotherapeutic agents and other targeted cancer drugs.

Dec 2015 : two Phase 3 trials fail, Merck will not apply for a license

Collaboration

Evofosfamide was developed by Threshold Pharmaceuticals Inc. In 2012, Threshold signed a global license and co-development agreement for evofosfamide with Merck KGaA, Darmstadt, Germany (EMD Serono Inc. in the US and Canada), which includes an option for Threshold to co-commercialize evofosfamide in the United States. Threshold is responsible for the development of evofosfamide in the soft tissue sarcoma indication in the United States. In all other cancer indications, Threshold and Merck KGaA are developing evofosfamide together. From 2012 to 2013, Merck KGaA paid 110 million US$ for upfront payment and milestone payments to Threshold. Additionally, Merck KGaA covers 70% of all evofosfamide development expenses.

Mechanism of prodrug activation and Mechanism of action (MOA) of the released drug

Evofosfamide is a 2-nitroimidazole prodrug of the cytotoxin bromo-isophosphoramide mustard (Br-IPM). Evofosfamide is activated by a process that involves a 1-electron (1 e−) reduction mediated by ubiquitous cellular reductases, such as the NADPH cytochrome P450, to generate a radical anion prodrug:
A) In the presence of oxygen (normoxia) the radical anion prodrug reacts rapidly with oxygen to generate the original prodrug and superoxide. Therefore, evofosfamide is relatively inert under normal oxygen conditions, remaining intact as a prodrug.
B) When exposed to severe hypoxic conditions (< 0.5% O2; hypoxic zones in many tumors), however, the radical anion undergoes irreversible fragmentation, releasing the active drug Br-IPM and an azole derivative. The released cytotoxin Br-IPM alkylates DNA, inducing intrastrand and interstrand crosslinks.

Evofosfamide is essentially inactive under normal oxygen levels. In areas of hypoxia, evofosfamide becomes activated and converts to an alkylating cytotoxic agent resulting in DNA cross-linking. This renders cells unable to replicable their DNA and divide, leading to apoptosis. This investigational therapeutic approach of targeting the cytotoxin to hypoxic zones in tumors may cause less broad systemic toxicity that is seen with untargeted cytotoxic chemotherapies.

The activation of evofosfamide to the active drug Br-IPM and the mechanism of action (MOA) via cross-linking of DNA is shown schematically below:

Drug development history

Phosphorodiamidate-based, DNA-crosslinking, bis-alkylator mustards have long been used successfully in cancer chemotherapy and include e.g. the prodrugs ifosfamide and cyclophosphamide. To demonstrate that known drugs of proven efficacy could serve as the basis of efficacious hypoxia-activated prodrugs, the 2-nitroimidizole HAP of the active phosphoramidate bis-alkylator derived from ifosfamide was synthesized. The resulting compound, TH-281, had a high HCR (hypoxia cytotoxicity ratio), a quantitative assessment of its hypoxia selectivity. Subsequent structure-activity relationship (SAR) studies showed that replacement of the chlorines in the alkylator portion of the prodrug with bromines improved potency about 10-fold. The resulting, final compound is evofosfamide (TH-302).

Synthesis

Evofosfamide can be synthesized in 7 steps.

Formulation

The evofosfamide drug product formulation used until 2011 was a lyophilized powder. The current drug product formulation is a sterile liquid containing ethanol, dimethylacetamide and polysorbate 80. For intravenous infusion, the evofosfamide drug product is diluted in 5% dextrose in WFI.

Diluted evofosfamide formulation (100 mg/mL evofosfamide, 70% ethanol, 25% dimethylacetamide and 5% polysorbate 80; diluted to 4% v/v in 5% dextrose or 0.9% NaCl) can cause leaching of DEHP from infusion bags containing PVC plastic.

Clinical trials

Overview and results

Evofosfamide (TH-302) is currently being evaluated in clinical studies as a monotherapy and in combination with chemotherapy agents and other targeted cancer drugs. The indications are a broad spectrum of solid tumor types and blood cancers.

Evofosfamide clinical trials (as of 21 November 2014) sorted by (Estimated) Primary Completion Date:

Soft tissue sarcoma

Both, evofosfamide and ifosfamide have been investigated in combination with doxorubicin in patients with advanced soft tissue sarcoma. The study TH-CR-403 is a single arm trial investigating evofosfamide in combination with doxorubicin. The study EORTC 62012 compares doxorubicin with doxorubicin plus ifosfamide. Doxorubicin and ifosfamide are generic products sold by many manufacturers.

The indirect comparison of both studies shows comparable hematologic toxicity and efficacy profiles of evofosfamide and ifosfamide in combination with doxorubicin. However, a longer overall survival of patients treated with evofosfamide/doxorubicin (TH-CR-403) trial was observed. The reason for this increase is probably the increased number of patients with certain sarcoma subtypes in the evofosfamide/doxorubicin TH-CR-403 trial, see table below.

However, in the Phase 3 TH-CR-406/SARC021 study (conducted in collaboration with the Sarcoma Alliance for Research through Collaboration (SARC)), patients with locally advanced unresectable or metastatic soft tissue sarcoma treated with evofosfamide in combination with doxorubicin did not demonstrate a statistically significant improvement in OS compared with doxorubicin alone (HR: 1.06; 95% CI: 0.88 - 1.29).

Metastatic pancreatic cancer

Both, evofosfamide and  protein-bound paclitaxel (nab-paclitaxel) have been investigated in combination with gemcitabine in patients with metastatic pancreatic cancer. The study TH-CR-404 compares gemcitabine with gemcitabine plus evofosfamide. The study CA046 compares gemcitabine with gemcitabine plus nab-paclitaxel. Gemcitabine is a generic product sold by many manufacturers.

The indirect comparison of both studies shows comparable efficacy profiles of evofosfamide and nab-paclitaxel in combination with gemcitabine. However, the hematologic toxicity is increased in patients treated with evofosfamide/gemcitabine (TH-CR-404 trial), see table below.

In the Phase 3 MAESTRO study, patients with previously untreated, locally advanced unresectable or metastatic pancreatic adenocarcinoma treated with evofosfamide in combination with gemcitabine did not demonstrate a statistically significant improvement in overall survival (OS) compared with gemcitabine plus placebo (hazard ratio [HR]: 0.84; 95% confidence interval [CI]: 0.71 - 1.01; p=0.0589).

Nasopharyngeal Carcinoma 
Oxygen deficient conditions are linked to tumor progression throughout the body and poses an issue in cancer treatments such as chemotherapy and radiation. Hypoxia-activated prodrugs (HAPs) function in hypoxic conditions and inhibit the growth of tumor cells. Evofosfamide is a HAP that targets tumor progression in nasopharyngeal carcinoma (NPC) tissues by inhibitng the overexpression of hypoxia-inducible factor-1α (HIF-1α).

In this study , the efficacy of Evofosfamide along with cisplastin (DDP) in blocking cell progression was measured. "The combination of evofosfamide with DDP had a synergistic effect on cytotoxicity in the NPC cell lines by combination index values assessment. Cell cycle G2 phase was arrested after treated with 0.05 μmol/L evofosfamide under hypoxia. Histone H2AX phosphorylation (γH2AX) (a marker of DNA damage) expression increased while HIF-1α expression suppressed after evofosfamide treatment under hypoxic conditions". These findings allow for evidence for Evofosfamide to be pushed towards  clinical trials to further investigate the potential to be developed as an FDA approved anticancer drug.

Drug development risks

Risks published in the quarterly/annual reports of Threshold and Merck KGaA that could affect the further development of evofosfamide (TH-302):

Risks related to the formulation

The evofosfamide formulation that Threshold and Merck KGaA are using in the clinical trials was changed in 2011 to address issues with storage and handling requirements that were not suitable for a commercial product. Additional testing is ongoing to verify if the new formulation is suitable for a commercial product. If this new formulation is also not suitable for a commercial product another formulation has to be developed and some or all respective clinical phase 3 trials may be required to be repeated which could delay the regulatory approvals.

Risks related to reimbursement

Even if Threshold/Merck KGaA succeed in obtaining regulatory approvals and bringing evofosfamide to the market, the amount reimbursed for evofosfamide may be insufficient and could adversely affect the profitability of both companies.  Obtaining reimbursement for evofosfamide from third-party and governmental payors depend upon a number of factors, e.g. effectiveness of the drug, suitable storage and handling requirements of the drug and advantages over alternative treatments.

There could be the case that the data generated in the clinical trials are sufficient to obtain regulatory approvals for evofosfamide but the use of evofosfamide has a limited benefit for the third-party and governmental payors. In this case Threshold/Merck KGaA could be forced to provide supporting scientific, clinical and cost effectiveness data for the use of evofosfamide to each payor. Threshold/Merck KGaA may not be able to provide data sufficient to obtain reimbursement.

Risks related to competition

Each cancer indication has a number of established medical therapies with which evofosfamide will compete, for example:
If approved for commercial sale for pancreatic cancer, evofosfamide would compete with gemcitabine (Gemzar), marketed by Eli Lilly and Company; erlotinib (Tarceva), marketed by Genentech and Astellas Oncology; protein-bound paclitaxel (Abraxane), marketed by Celgene; and FOLFIRINOX, which is a combination of generic products that are sold individually by many manufacturers. 
If approved for commercial sale for soft tissue sarcoma, evofosfamide could potentially compete with doxorubicin or the combination of doxorubicin and ifosfamide, generic products sold by many manufacturers.

Risks related to manufacture and supply

Threshold relies on third-party contract manufacturers for the manufacture of evofosfamide to meet its and Merck KGaA's clinical supply needs. Any inability of the third-party contract manufacturers to produce adequate quantities could adversely affect the clinical development and commercialization of evofosfamide. Furthermore, Threshold has no long-term supply agreements with any of these contract manufacturers and additional agreements for more supplies of evofosfamide will be needed to complete the clinical development and/or commercialize it. In this regard, Merck KGaA has to enter into agreements for additional supplies or develop such capability itself. The clinical programs and the potential commercialization of evofosfamide could be delayed if Merck KGaA is unable to secure the supply.

History

References

Experimental cancer drugs
Prodrugs
Alkylating antineoplastic agents
Merck brands
Nitrogen mustards
Phosphorodiamidates
Nitroimidazoles
Organobromides
Bromoethyl compounds